Off Season is a 2001 television film directed by Bruce Davison, and starring Sherilyn Fenn, Rory Culkin, Hume Cronyn, Adam Arkin, and Bruce Davison. It is about a presumably disturbed little boy (Culkin) who has been orphaned, and who comes to believe that a local guest (Cronyn) who is staying at the hotel at which the boy's aunt works is actually Santa Claus.

Plot 
After the death of his parents in a car crash, Jackson Mayhew (Culkin) is sent to live with his aunt who works in a hotel. He comes across an elderly gentleman named Sam who convinces Jackson that he is Santa Claus. A police officer eventually discovers that "Santa" is a con-artist wanted in several states for grand theft, fraud and other crimes
But eventually Patty (Fenn) discovers that the officer was an actor who was hired by Sam to pretend that he was a criminal. The story ends when Jackson discovers that his psychiatrist was the real Santa Claus.

External links 
 

2001 television films
2001 films
American television films
Films scored by Daniel Licht
2000s English-language films
Santa Claus in film